Aleksei Ivanovich Kosonogov (born 30 March 1982) is a Russian former professional footballer.

Club career
He played in the Russian Football National League for FC Volga Ulyanovsk in 2008.

References

External links
 

1982 births
People from Vyksa
Living people
Russian footballers
Russia youth international footballers
Russia under-21 international footballers
Association football forwards
FK Kareda Kaunas players
US Créteil-Lusitanos players
Tours FC players
FC Spartak Kostroma players
FC Spartak Tambov players
A Lyga players
Ligue 2 players
Russian expatriate footballers
Expatriate footballers in Lithuania
Expatriate footballers in France
FC Girondins de Bordeaux players
FC Volga Ulyanovsk players
Sportspeople from Nizhny Novgorod Oblast